Museo civico aufidenate (Italian for Civic Museum of Aufidena, an ancient Roman town)  is an archaeology museum in Castel di Sangro, Province of L'Aquila (Abruzzo).

History

Collection

Notes

External links

Castel di Sangro
Museums in Abruzzo
Archaeological museums in Italy